The criterion of embarrassment is a type of historical analysis in which a historical account is deemed likely to be true under the inference that that the author would have no reason to invent a historical account which might embarrass them. Certain Biblical scholars have used this as a metric for assessing whether the New Testament's accounts of Jesus' actions and words are historically probable.

The criterion of embarrassment is one of the criteria of authenticity used by academics, the others being the criterion of dissimilarity, the criterion of language and environment, criterion of coherence, and the criterion of multiple attestation.

History
The criterion of embarrassment is a long-standing tool of New Testament research. The phrase was used by John P. Meier in his 1991 book A Marginal Jew; he attributed it to Edward Schillebeeckx (1914–2009), who does not appear to have actually used the term in his written works. The earliest use of the approach was possibly by Paul Wilhelm Schmiedel in the Encyclopaedia Biblica (1899).

Examples
The assumption of the criterion of embarrassment is that the early church would hardly have gone out of its way to create or falsify historical material that embarrassed its author or weakened its position in arguments with opponents. Rather, embarrassing material coming from Jesus would be either suppressed or softened in later stages of the Gospel tradition. This criterion is rarely used by itself, and is typically one of a number of criteria, such as the criterion of dissimilarity and the criterion of multiple attestation, along with the historical method.

The crucifixion of Jesus is an example of an event that meets the criterion of embarrassment. This method of execution was considered the most shameful and degrading in the Roman world, and advocates of the criterion claim this method of execution is therefore the least likely to have been invented by the followers of Jesus.

Limitations
The criterion of embarrassment has its limitations and is almost always used in concert with the other criteria.  One limitation to the criterion of embarrassment is that clear-cut cases of such embarrassment are few.  Clearly, context is important, as what might be considered as embarrassing in one era and social context may not have been so in another. Embarrassing details may be included as an alternative to an even more embarrassing account of the same event. As a hypothetical example, Saint Peter's denial of Jesus could have been a substitution for an even greater misdeed of Peter.

An example of the second point is found in the stories of the Infancy Gospels. In one account from the Infancy Gospel of Thomas, a very young Jesus is said to have used his supernatural powers first to strike dead, and then revive, a playmate who had accidentally bumped into him. If this tradition had been accepted as worthy of inclusion at some key juncture in the formation of the Christian Bible (and hence integrated in one way or another among the canonical Gospels), arguably many modern Christians would find it quite embarrassing—especially strict believers in biblical inerrancy. But as is suggested by the existence of this early non-canonical pericope, it must not have been embarrassing to some early Christians.

A further limitation is the possibility that what could be classed as embarrassing could also be an intentionally created account designed to provoke a reaction. For instance, Saint Peter's denial of Jesus could have been written as an example of the consequences of denial. : "Whoever acknowledges me before men, I will also acknowledge him before my Father in heaven. But whoever disowns me before men, I will disown him before my Father in heaven."

See also
 Criterion of contextual credibility
 Criterion of dissimilarity
 Criterion of multiple attestation
 Lectio difficilior potior
 Declaration against interest

References

Further reading
Meier, John P., A Marginal Jew: Rethinking the Historical Jesus, Doubleday: 1991. vol 1: p. 168–171.

External links
 The Criterion of Embarrassment and Jesus' Baptism by John

Historiography
Biblical criticism
1899 introductions